Camperduin  (Kamperduin) is a hamlet in the Dutch province of North Holland. It is a part of the municipality of Bergen, and lies about 12 km northwest of Alkmaar.

The hamlet was first mentioned between 918 and 948 Campthorpa. The current name means "dunes near the cultivated field". It has place name signs, however the camp sites have also placed Camperduin aan Zee (Camperduin on Sea) to indicate that it is a seaside resort, however the entire hamlet is near the sea. Camperduinen used to be a village. A church was built in 1689, but demolished in 1807.

The village gave its name to the Battle of Camperdown which took place off the coast.

Gallery

References

Populated places in North Holland
Bergen, North Holland